Smith's longspur (Calcarius pictus) is a bird from the family Calcariidae, which also contains the other species of longspurs. A bird of open habitats, it breeds in northern Canada and Alaska, and winters in the southern United States. Primarily a ground-feeding seed-eater, it supplements its diet with insects in the summer.

Description 
These birds have short cone-shaped bills, streaked backs, and dark tails with white outer rectrices. In breeding state plumage (mostly formed by worn basic plumage), the male has a pumpkin-orange throat, nape, and underparts contrasting with an intricate black-and-white face pattern. The white lesser coverts are quite pronounced on a male in spring and early summer. Females and immatures have lightly streaked buffy underparts, dark crowns, brown wings with less obvious white lesser coverts, and a light-colored face. The tail is identical at all ages.

Measurements:

 Length: 5.9-6.7 in (15-17 cm)
 Weight: 0.7-1.1 oz (20-32 g)
 Wingspan: 25 cm

Distribution and habitat 
This bird breeds in open grassy areas near the tree line in northern Canada and Alaska. In winter, they congregate in open fields, including airports, in the south-central United States. Migration is elliptical, with northbound birds staging in Illinois in the spring and southbound birds flying over the Great Plains in the fall.

Behavior 
These birds nest in small colonies; males do not defend territory. The female lays three to five eggs in a grass cup nest on the ground. Both males and females may have more than one mate. The parents, one female and possibly more than one male, feed the young birds.

These birds forage on the ground, gathering in flocks outside of the nesting season. They mainly eat seeds, also eating insects in summer. Young birds are mainly fed insects.

The song is a sweet warble that is inflected at the end, somewhat reminiscent of the chestnut-sided warbler. The call is a dry rattle, like a shortened version of the call of a female brown-headed cowbird, noticeably drier than that of Lapland longspur.

Audubon named this bird after his friend Gideon B. Smith.

References

External links
 Photo gallery - VIREO

Birds described in 1832
Birds of Canada
Calcarius
Native birds of Alaska
Taxa named by William John Swainson